Todor Ivanchov (1858 – 1906) was a supporter of Vasil Radoslavov who served as Prime Minister of Bulgaria from 13 October 1899 to 25 January 1901.

Born in Veliko Tarnovo, he was educated at Robert College and in Montpellier, specializing in economics. He served as the editor of a number of Bulgarian newspapers and joined the Cabinet in 1885 under Petko Karavelov, serving as Minister of National Enlightenment. He was Minister of Education when he was chosen to be Prime Minister in 1899. During his own Premiership Ivanchov also held the role of Minister of Finance.  He enacted a series of reforms to improve the civil service. He was, however, considered a weak leader.

In 1903 he was put on trial by the State Court for constitutional violations whilst a member of Radoslavov's cabinet. Sentenced to eight months' imprisonment, he was later pardoned.

References

 

1858 births
1906 deaths
People from Veliko Tarnovo
Liberal Party (Bulgaria) politicians
Liberal Party (Radoslavists) politicians
Prime Ministers of Bulgaria
Finance ministers of Bulgaria
Robert College alumni
19th-century Bulgarian people